Nationality words link to articles with information on the nation's poetry or literature (for instance, Irish or France).

Events
 Christopher Smart wins the Seatonian Prize for "On the Attributes of the Supreme Being"

Works published
 William Collins, The Passions: An ode
 Thomas Cooke, An Ode on Moartial Virtue, published anonymously
 Robert Dodsley, The Oeconomy of Human Life, published anonymously; has also been attributed to Philip Stanhope, 4th Earl of Chesterfield; published this year, although the book states "1751"
 Mary Jones, Miscellanies in Prose and Verse
 Charlotte Lennox, The Art of Coquetry
 James Thomson, Poems on Several Occasions, posthumous
 Thomas Warton, the younger, New-market, published anonymously this year, although the book states "1751"
 Edward Young, The Complaint; or, Night-Thoughts on Life, Death and Immortality, published anonymously; the collected edition of Nights, Books 1–9 (see The Complaint 1742)

Births
Death years link to the corresponding "[year] in poetry" article:
 April 24 – John Trumbull (died 1831), American poet
 June 19 – Lemuel Hopkins (died 1801), American poet and satirist
 July 30 – John Taylor (died 1826), English businessman, poet and Unitarian hymn writer
 September 5 – Robert Fergusson (died 1774), Scottish poet
 September 18 – Tomás de Iriarte y Oropesa (died 1791), Spanish poet
 October 31 – Leonor de Almeida Portugal (died 1839), Portuguese poet
 November 7 – Count Friedrich Leopold zu Stolberg-Stolberg (died 1819), German poet
 December 8 – Lady Anne Barnard, née Lindsay (died 1825), Scottish poet and author of the ballad "Auld Robin Gray"

Deaths
Birth years link to the corresponding "[year] in poetry" article:
 February 8 – Aaron Hill (born 1685), English dramatist, poet and miscellaneous writer
 March 20 – Johann Sigismund Scholze (born 1705), German
 March 21 – Mehetabel Wesley Wright (born 1697), English
 July 29 – Laetitia Pilkington (born c. 1709), Anglo-Irish poet and memoirist
 John Winstanley (born 1678?), Anglo-Irish

See also

Poetry
List of years in poetry

Notes

18th-century poetry
Poetry